IHF Handball Challenge is a series of professional Handball simulation video games developed by German studio Neutron Games.

IHF Handball Challenge 12

IHF Handball Challenge 12 is the first sports game ever devoted to handball (excluding management game Handball Manager and the arcade game Heavy Smash/Hyper Handball). Developed by Neutron Games for PC. It was released on October 28, 2011. On
February 3, 2011, Neutron Games announced that the game would be sponsored by the International Handball Federation, so that all national teams are included in the game. The game also includes the World Men's Handball Championship.

Leagues
 – Bundesliga
 – Liga ASOBAL
 Rest Of The World
 National Teams

IHF Handball Challenge 14

IHF Handball Challenge 14 is the second video game developed by Neutron Games, and released for the PlayStation 3, Windows, Xbox 360 by Bigben Interactive.

References

External links
Official website

Sports video games
2011 video games
2014 video games
PlayStation 3 games
Video games developed in Germany
Windows games
Windows-only games
Xbox 360 games
International Handball Federation
Handball culture